The Baron Hill (Spanish: Cerro Barón) is one of the 42 hills of the city of Valparaiso, Chile. It is located on the east end of the plan of the city, next to the Dairy Hill, and is a purely residential area. His name is that in 1795 the place was built a fort to protect the area from El Almendral and the northern part of the bay pirate attack, and to call it, the city council decided to pay tribute to Governor Ambrosio O'Higgins, who held the title of Baron of Ballenary, naming the fort finally as Fort of Baron Ballenary, finally giving the name to the hill.

Its development began with the development of the sector of El Almendral and construction in 1852 and the station armory Baron, first railway station of Valparaiso to Santiago. Besides the hill going the only path to the city of Quillota. Also hosted a lot of Italian immigrants, who had business in the plan.

On the hill is the Church of San Francisco, responsible for the nickname given to Valparaiso, Pancho, as it was the most recognizable by the sailors who came to the city. It is also the location of the Baron elevator, built in 1906.

Hills of Valparaíso